Rain or Rain (Pty) Ltd is a South African mobile communications company, providing voice, messaging, data and converged services.

History 
Rain launched in February 2019, and began providing data only services using 3000 of their own cell towers and leasing infrastructure from Vodacom and MTN.

In June 2020, rain announced the addition of 1500 5G standalone towers to be launched in 2021

Technology 
Rain offers data-only mobile network services in South Africa. They provide 4G and LTE services through a partnership to use Vodacom and MTNs infrastructure. It launched The first Standalone 5G (3600) network in the country. Powered by Huawei.

Rain’s Standalone 5G is currently available in major metropolitan areas around the country.

Controversies

Ban Claiming “Unlimited Data 24/7 on 5G” 
In August 2020, the advertising appeal committee of the advertising regulatory bureau banned rain from claiming unlimited 5G 24/7 after receiving multiple complaints from the public

Spectrum Arrangements 
in October 2021, Telkom has approached Independent Communications Authority of South Africa (ICASA) to report spectrum arrangements between competitors Vodacom and Rain.
Telkom argues Vodacom’s ability to control Rain’s spectrum entrenches its position as a dominant player in a highly concentrated market. An investigation is still underway.

Ownership

See also 

 Telephone numbers in Africa
 Telephone numbers in South Africa
 MTN (South Africa)
 Cell C
 Telkom Mobile
Internet in South Africa

References

External links 
 

Mobile phone companies of South Africa
Telecommunications companies established in 2018
Companies based in Johannesburg